Paul Frank Nicholls  (born 17 April 1962) is a British National Hunt horse trainer with stables at Ditcheat, Somerset. A relatively successful jump jockey, Nicholls has become the leading National Hunt trainer of his generation, finishing the 2007–08 season with 155 winners and a record £4 million in prize money. To date, he has trained over 3000 winners, won the 2012 Grand National, four Cheltenham Gold Cups and has been crowned British jump racing Champion Trainer thirteen times.

Early life
The son of a policeman, Nicholls was educated at Marlwood School, Alveston before leaving at 16 to take up work in a local point-to-point yard.

Jockey career
Nicholls turned conditional in 1982 under the tutelage of Josh Gifford before joining David Barons in 1985, and became stable jockey in 1986. It was with Barons that Nicholls was most closely associated during his riding career. The pair enjoyed numerous big race successes, including back-to-back wins in the Hennessy Gold Cup at Newbury with Broadheath in 1986 and Playschool the following year. Playschool also won the 1987 Welsh Grand National, and the 1988 Irish Hennessey with Nicholls. Playschool was subsequently made favourite for the 1988 Cheltenham Gold Cup but was pulled up before the 20th fence. Barons attributed Playschool's lacklustre performance to doping but his claims were never substantiated. Following a broken leg when kicked by a horse during pre-season training sustained in 1989, Nicholls retired from the saddle having ridden a respectable 133 winners during a seven-year career.

Training career
Nicholls took out his trainer's licence in 1991, having served a two-year apprenticeship as assistant trainer to Barons which saw him assist in Seagram's winning Grand National attempt. In response to an advert placed in the Sporting Life, Nicholls began his training operation at Manor Farm, Ditcheat, in stables rented from local dairy farmer Paul Barber. Starting with just eight horses, his first winner soon followed, the appropriately named Olveston, owned by Nicholls' father and named after the South Gloucestershire village in which he was raised. A steady climb up the training ladder followed, with Nicholls' first grade one success coming with See More Indians in the Feltham Novices' Chase at Kempton in 1993. 

However, it was the 1999 Cheltenham Festival that saw Nicholls' breakthrough into jump racing's elite, winning three of the most prestigious steeplechases in National Hunt racing. Nicholls enjoyed a memorable meeting, collecting the Queen Mother Champion Chase with Call Equiname, the Arkle Challenge Trophy with Flagship Uberalles, and the Gold Cup with See More Business. However, it was not until the end of the 2005–06 season, after seven years of filling the runners up spot that Nicholls was finally crowned Champion Trainer for the first time, his eventual coronation coming after a long struggle for supremacy with multiple champion Martin Pipe.

The appointment of the Irish rider Ruby Walsh as stable jockey strengthened Nicholls' hand in the big races. Their major successes include the Queen Mother Champion Chase with Azertyuiop (2004) and Master Minded (2008 and 2009), five wins in the King George VI Chase with Kauto Star (2006, 2007, 2008, 2009 and 2011) and the Cheltenham Gold Cup with Kauto Star in 2007 and 2009. Nicholls' finest hour came in the 2008 Cheltenham Gold Cup where he saddled the first three horses home: in finishing order, Denman (ridden by Sam Thomas), Kauto Star and Neptune Collonges. At the high of his stable stars' powers, Nicholls' dominance extended across the Irish Sea and his horses plundered Ireland's most valuable jumping prizes with increasing regularity. 

In December 2008, Nicholls trained his 50th grade one winner when Master Minded (ridden by AP McCoy) won the Tingle Creek Chase at Sandown, and on 5 November 2011, Kauto Stone made Nicholls the fastest National Hunt trainer to reach 2000 winners.

Many equine stars have been nurtured by Nicholls and there are few top prizes to elude him, the two missing races from his UK portfolio were added in 2012 when Rock on Ruby won the Champion Hurdle and Neptune Collonges, ridden by Daryl Jacob, won the Grand National.

In April 2016, he won the champion trainer's title for the tenth time.

Nicholls was appointed Officer of the Order of the British Empire (OBE) in the 2020 New Year Honours for services to the horse racing industry.

Personal life
Nicholls is renowned for being approachable and media-friendly. He writes a popular column on Betfair and his frank and honest opinions are well respected by members of the racing public. 

Away from racing, Nicholls has a keen interest in horticulture, particularly rose growing. He is also an avid supporter of Manchester United, whose long-time manager Sir Alex Ferguson has several horses in training with Nicholls.

In November 2009, Nicholls starred alongside Kauto Star in a short film to promote Somerset, commissioned by inward investment agency Into Somerset.

He has been married three times. He married Georgie Brown in Barbados in May 2011. The couple have two children, while Nicholls also has a daughter from his second marriage.

Cheltenham winners (48)
 Cheltenham Gold Cup - (4) See More Business (1999), Kauto Star (2007, 2009), Denman (2008)
 Queen Mother Champion Chase - (6) Call Equiname (1999), Azertyuiop (2004), Master Minded (2008, 2009), Dodging Bullets (2015), Politologue (2020)
 Stayers' Hurdle - (4) Big Buck's (2009, 2010, 2011, 2012)
 Champion Hurdle - (1) Rock On Ruby (2012)
 Supreme Novices' Hurdle - (2) Noland (2006), Al Ferof (2011)
 Triumph Hurdle - (2) Celestial Halo (2008), Zarkandar (2011)
 Arkle Challenge Trophy - (2) Flagship Uberalles (1999), Azertyuiop (2003)
 Brown Advisory Novices' Chase - (3) Star de Mohaison (2006), Denman (2007), Topofthegame (2019)
 Golden Miller Novices' Chase - (1) Stage Star (2023)
 Ryanair Chase - (3) Thisthatandtother (2005), Taranis (2007), Frodon (2019)
 Centenary Novices' Handicap Chase - (1) Chapoturgeon (2009)
 Coral Cup - (1) 	Aux Ptits Soins (2015)
 Fred Winter Juvenile Novices' Handicap Hurdle - (3) Sanctuaire (2010), Qualando (2015), Diego du Charmil (2016)
 County Handicap Hurdle - (4) Sporazene (2004), Desert Quest (2006), American Trilogy (2009), Lac Fontana (2014)
 St James's Place Foxhunter Chase - (4) Earthmover (2004), Sleeping Night (2005), Pacha du Polder (2017, 2018)
 Johnny Henderson Grand Annual Chase - (4) St Pirran (2004), Andreas (2007), Solar Impulse (2016), Le Prezien (2018)
 Martin Pipe Conditional Jockeys' Handicap Hurdle - (2) Salubrious (2013), Ibis du Rheu (2016)
 Albert Bartlett Novices' Hurdle - (1) Stay Away Fay (2023)

Major wins
 Great Britain
 Grand National - (1) Neptune Collonges (2012)
 King George VI Chase - (13) See More Business (1997, 1999), Kauto Star (2006, 2007, 2008, 2009, 2011), Silviniaco Conti (2013, 2014), Clan Des Obeaux (2018, 2019), Frodon (2020), Bravemansgame (2022)
 Tingle Creek Chase - (12) Flagship Uberalles (1999), Cenkos (2002), Kauto Star (2005, 2006), Twist Magic (2007, 2009), Master Minded (2008, 2010), Dodging Bullets (2014), Politologue (2017,2020), Greaneteen (2021)
 Betfair Chase - (6) Kauto Star (2006, 2007, 2009, 2011), Silviniaco Conti (2012, 2014)
 Henry VIII Novices' Chase - (7) Dines (1998), Thisthatandtother (2003), Marodima (2007), Al Ferof (2011), Hinterland (2013), Vibrato Valtat (2014), Dynamite Dollars (2018)
 Fighting Fifth Hurdle - (2) Irving (2014,2016) 
 Kauto Star Novices' Chase - (5) See More Indians (1993), Strong Flow (2003), Breedsbreeze (2008), Black Corton (2017), Bravemansgame (2021)
 Finale Juvenile Hurdle - (2) Adrien Du Pont (2015), Quel Destin (2018)
 Challow Novices' Hurdle - (5) Cornish Rebel (2004), Denman (2006), Bravemansgame (2020), Stage Star (2021), Hermes Allen (2022)
 Tolworth Novices' Hurdle - (5) Thisthatandtother (2003), Noland (2006), Silverburn (2007), Breedsbreeze (2008), Tahmuras (2023)
 Clarence House Chase - (5) Call Equiname (1999), Master Minded(2009, 2011), Twist Magic (2010), Dodging Bullets (2015)
 Ascot Chase - (4) Rockforce (2000), Kauto Star (2008), Silviniaco Conti (2016), Cyrname (2019)
 Anniversary 4-Y-O Novices' Hurdle - (4) Le Duc (2003), Zarkandar (2011), All Yours (2015), Monmiral (2021)
 Betway Bowl - (6) See More Business (2000), What a Friend (2010), Silviniaco Conti (2014, 2015), Clan Des Obeaux (2021, 2022)
 Aintree Hurdle - (1) Zarkandar (2013)
 Top Novices' Hurdle - (1) Pierrot Lunaire (2008)
 Mildmay Novices' Chase - (3) Star de Mohaison (2006), Silviniaco Conti (2012), Saphir Du Rheu (2015)
 Melling Chase - (3) Fadalko (2001), Master Minded (2011), Politologue (2018)
 Mersey Novices' Hurdle - (4) Garde Champetre (2004), Natal (2006), Elusive Dream (2008), Lac Fontana (2014)
 Maghull Novices' Chase - (8) Flagship Uberalles (1999), Armaturk (2002), Le Roi Miguel (2003), Twist Magic (2007), Tataniano (2010), San Benedeto (2017), Diego Du Charmil (2018)
 Liverpool Hurdle - (4) Big Buck's (2009,2010,2011,2012)
 Celebration Chase - (7) Cenkos (2002, 2004), Andreas (2008), Twist Magic (2009), Sanctuaire (2012), Greaneteen (2021,2022)
 Sefton Novices' Hurdle - (1) Gelino Bello (2022)

 Ireland
 Irish Gold Cup - (1) Neptune Collonges (2009)
 Punchestown Gold Cup - (3) Neptune Collonges (2007,2008), Clan des Obeaux (2021)
 Punchestown Champion Chase - (2) Twist Magic (2008), Master Minded (2009)
 Ladbrokes Champion Chase - (5) Taranis (2007), Kauto Star (2008, 2010), Kauto Stone (2012), Frodon (2021)
 John Durkan Memorial Punchestown Chase - (1) Noland (2008)
 Savills Chase - (3) Denman (2007), What a Friend (2009), Tidal Bay (2012)
 Ryanair Novice Chase - (1) Le Roi Miguel (2003)
 Champion Four Year Old Hurdle - (1) Sporazene (2003)

 France
 Grande Course de Haies d'Auteuil - (1) Ptit Zig (2016)
 Prix Renaud du Vivier - (1) Ptit Zig (2013)
 Grand Prix d'Automne - (1) Zarkandar (2014)

References

External links
 Paul Nicholls Racing
 Lucky Break: The Autobiography Amazon.co.uk
 Lucky Break, by Paul Nicholls The Independent, 24 January 2010
 Racing People: Paul Nicholls Racing Base, 29 September 2009

British racehorse trainers
English jockeys
1962 births
Living people
People from Lydney
Officers of the Order of the British Empire
People from Somerset